Diego Catalán y Menéndez-Pidal (16 September 1928 – 9 April 2008) was a Spanish philologist.  He died of heart disease on 9 April 2008, at the age of 79.

Biography 
Diego Catalán y Menéndez-Pidal was the son of  Miguel Catalán Sañudo and Jimena Menéndez-Pidal, and therefore the grandson of philologist Ramón Menéndez Pidal, and María Goyri de Menéndez Pidal.

Catalán was primarily a medievalist, he chaired the Ramón Menéndez Pidal Foundation which aims to continue Pidal's work, especially in the field of Hispanic Ballads, editing and study of texts and the history of the Spanish language. He coordinated a large project, the pan Hispanic ballads, which aimed to collect and preserve texts.

Catalán was the owner of The Ballads Archive which covers materials and work of philological and historical research. The archive is held by the Ramón Menéndez Pidal Foundation and includes works from the late nineteenth century to the present day. It is available to scholars for research purposes. The archive was considered part of the "National Treasure" and, as such, was protected at the headquarters of the League of Nations in Geneva during the Spanish Civil War.

References 

1928 births
2008 deaths
Dialectologists
Spanish philologists
Spanish medievalists
20th-century philologists